Badel may refer to:

 Badel, Germany, a village in Germany
 Badel, Somalia, a village in Somalia
 Alan Badel, an English actor
 Sarah Badel, an English actress
 RK Badel 1862 Zagreb, an old name for the Croatian handball club RK Zagreb
 Badel 1862, a Croatian beverage producer
 Alternative spelling of Bedel in Bedel Pass